Paul Collins Broun Sr. (March 1, 1916 – February 14, 2005) was an American politician and businessman who served as a member of the Georgia State Senate for the 46th district from 1963 to 2001. He was a member of the Democratic Party.

Early life and education 
Broun was born in Shellman, Georgia. In 1930, Broun moved with his family to Athens, Georgia. Broun graduated from Athens High School in 1933. He received his bachelor's degree in agricultural engineering from University of Georgia in 1937. During World War II, Broun served in the United States Army and was commissioned a lieutenant colonel.

Career 
Broun owned a car dealership and tire business in Athens, Georgia. Broun served in the Georgia Senate from 1963 to 2001 as a Democrat.

Personal life 
Broun died in Athens, Georgia. His son, Paul Broun, served in the United States House of Representatives.

Notes

1916 births
2005 deaths
Politicians from Athens, Georgia
People from Shellman, Georgia
Military personnel from Georgia (U.S. state)
Businesspeople from Georgia (U.S. state)
University of Georgia alumni
Democratic Party Georgia (U.S. state) state senators
United States Army personnel of World War II
United States Army colonels
20th-century American politicians
20th-century American businesspeople